Dorsa Aldrovandi is a wrinkle ridge system at  in Mare Serenitatis on the Moon. It is about 127 km long and was named after the 16th century Italian naturalist Ulisse Aldrovandi. The north end of the feature is at the crater Le Monnier, and the south end is close to the craters Clerke and Abetti.

Southeast of the ridge is Catena Littrow.  West of the southernmost part of the ridge are the crater Borel and the nearest other wrinkle ridge Dorsa Lister.

References

External links

Dorsa Aldrovandi at The Moon Wiki
LAC-42

Aldrovandi
Mare Serenitatis